Beech Bottom may refer to:

Beech Bottom, Tennessee, an unincorporated community in the United States
Beech Bottom, West Virginia, an unincorporated community in the United States
Beech Bottom Dyke, an ancient dyke in the United Kingdom